The Penang Hop-On Hop-Off bus service is a transit bus service within the city of George Town in Penang, Malaysia. Launched in 2014 by a Malaysian firm, Elang Wah Sdn Bhd, it utilises open-topped double-decker buses that ply two routes within the city. The bus service caters mainly to tourists, although it was initially marketed to local commuters as well.

Due to the COVID-19 pandemic and movement control order in 2020, the Penang Hop-On Hop-Off bus service has ceased operations.

Routes 
The Penang Hop-On Hop-Off service covers two circular routes within the city of George Town in Penang. The two routes - namely the City Route and the Beach Route - are joined at the city's Gurney Drive, allowing passengers to switch between both routes.

Fares

See also 
 Rapid Penang
 Transport in Penang

References

External links 
 Penang Hop-On Hop-Off Official Website

2014 establishments in Malaysia
Transport in Penang
Bus transport in Malaysia